Infernus is a Norwegian black metal musician and founding member of Gorgoroth.

Infernus may also refer to:
 Infernus (album), an album by Hate Eternal
 Infernus, a Subskimmer-like submersible developed by students in Sweden

See also
Inferius, a type of animated corpse in the Harry Potter scenario
 Inferno (disambiguation)